Dance of Flags (Hebrew: ריקוד דגלים or ריקודגלים, Rikud Degalim), or Flags March ( Mitzad ha'Degalim), is an annual flag flying parade on Jerusalem Day (28 Iyar, Hebrew calendar) in Jerusalem and on a smaller scale every Rosh Chodesh (better known as Sivuv She'arim), from the afternoon until the evening, to celebrate what Israelis term the "reunification of Jerusalem", following the military occupation of East Jerusalem and the West Bank after the 1967 Six Day War (with Israel later only annexing the former).

The event is frequently marred by hate speech and violence and was one of the reasons for the 2021 Israel–Gaza escalation.

History 

This parade began in 1968 with habit of Rabbi Zvi Yehuda Kook and his followers in Mercaz HaRav Yeshiva to march to the Western Wall through Jaffa Road, singing and dancing, at night after the end of the holiday rally at the Yeshiva Hall. In 1974, Yehuda Hazani, a yeshiva student, initiated the bringing of an orchestra and the joining of high school yeshivot to the event. It was later decided to move the event to daytime to allow more people to take part in the march. Today, the march is organized by the "Am Kalavi" (עם כלביא) association, and the procession is headed by Rabbi Haim Drukman. The event is funded by the association, the Jerusalem Municipality, the Ministry of Education and the Society for the Rehabilitation and Development of the Jewish Quarter. In 2018, the event cost about NIS 1 million.

During the parade, Israeli flag-bearers march through the city streets, accompanied by mobile orchestras on trucks playing Hassidic songs. At several points along the way, stationary stages are set up on which performances by artists take place. Although in the first years of the parade, various sectors of the Israeli society took part in it, today, most of the participants in the march and celebrations are members of Religious Zionism who journey to the city from all over Israel.

In most years, the parade began in the area of center of Jerusalem, from Independence Park or Sacher Park, then ascended east toward Jaffa Road, through Safra Square, to IDF Square. Mass dancing in collaboration with singers and public figures. In recent years there has been a separation and women march in front of men or vice versa. In the past, marchers used to enter the Old City through the Lions' Gate as well, but in the years 2010-2016, the police banned entry from this gate. In 2011, the police diverted the march route eastwards, and it passed from Sheikh Jarrah along the Municipal Road No. 1 (Bar Lev Boulevard), and as before, entered the Old City through some of its gates. In 2017, in honor of the 50th anniversary of the Reunification of Jerusalem, it was decided that the flag dance would also surround the Old City from the east and enter through the Dung Gate.

Hate speech and violence

The event, which passes through the city's Muslim Quarter, is frequently marred by Israeli nationalists chanting racist phrases and calls to violence, including "death to Arabs" and "may your villages burn." This feature of the parade dates back at least a decade, with marchers in 2011 also surrounding a mosque and frantically chanting "Muhammad is dead" and "They are only Arabs, they are only fleas".

In several marches over the years, there have been clashes between march participants and Arabs residents of East Jerusalem. The frictions involved physical and verbal violence on both sides. Some criticized the very existence of the event, especially from the left side of the Israeli political spectrum. In 2015 and 2016, the High Court rejected petitions filed by the Ir Amim organization and the Tag Meir organization, demanding that the procession be prevented from crossing the Muslim Quarter.

2021 interrupted march
In May 2021, the flag march was held in parallel with Eid al-Fitr. After the riots broke out in Jerusalem, the government blocked the entrance to the Old City that was part of the march event, and the government under direction from then Prime Minister Netanyahu decided to postpone the entire event, to show that all of Jerusalem is united, and that they would not celebrate its liberation only in part of it. The march continued, but was stopped after about two hours, when alarms were sounded throughout the city. The incident was dispersed by the police without any opposition from the celebrants, but a rally was held at the Western Wall in parallel with the riots throughout the Temple Mount. The organizers of the parade planned a few days after the end of the escalation to complete the parade, which did not take place in its entirety. The march was scheduled for June 15, 2021, and was also approved by the new government, despite Hamas threats of military escalation.

See also 
Flag flying day
Flag of Israel
Jerusalem March
List of observances set by the Hebrew calendar

References

External links 

1968 establishments in Israel
Annual events in Israel
Events in Jerusalem
Festivals established in 1968
Festivals in Jerusalem
Flag flying days
Iyar observances
National symbols of Israel
Parades in Israel
Religious Zionism